Frank Austin ( 1938–March 2, 2017), also called Bahah Zhonie ("Happy Boy" in Navajo), is a Navajo American painter and textile artist born in Tsegi Canyon, Arizona, under the Navajo Salt Clan. He  has exhibited his work across the country and is known for his silkscreen designs and textile paintings. Some of his works are in the permanent collection of institutions including the Smithsonian National Museum of the American Indian.

Austin's work included portraits, landscapes, and depictions of wildlife. He worked for a time under Lloyd H. New as a textile artist at Kiva Fashion-Creative. In 1970 he opened a textile business, Nizhonie Fabrics, in Cortez, Colorado, offering hand-printed textiles.

Personal life 
Austin was one of eight children of Buck and Martha Smallcanyon Austin. He studied at the Phoenix Indian School, graduating in 1958. He then attended Arizona State University and the University of Arizona as the recipient of a Southwest Indian Art Scholarship as well as a Rockefeller Scholarship.

He married Rose L. Adajie in 1960 and had three children. Austin died in March 2017 in Albuquerque, New Mexico.

External links 

 Frank Austin works at the Smithsonian National Museum of the American Indian

References 

2017 deaths
20th-century American painters
20th-century indigenous painters of the Americas
Navajo painters
Navajo artists
Painters from Arizona
Native American textile artists
Textile designers
Arizona State University alumni
University of Arizona alumni
20th-century American printmakers
21st-century Native Americans